Deans Creek is a river in the U.S. State of California.

References

Rivers of Santa Cruz County, California